Openclipart, also called Open Clip Art Library, is an online media repository of free-content vector clip art. The project hosts over 160,000 free graphics and has billed itself as "the largest community of artists making the best free original clipart for you to use for absolutely any reason".

The website was brought down for several months by a reported DDoS attack in April 2019; access to the library via other means was still possible, including partial copies of the library that were hosted on several mirror sites. The site's search feature was restored in May 2020.

History
The Openclipart library (OCAL) was established in early 2004 by Jon Phillips and Bryce Harrington, who had worked together to develop the open-source vector graphics suites Sodipodi and its successor, Inkscape. The OCAL project initially grew out of a project started by Christian Schaller (Uraeus), who, on October 26, 2003, issued a challenge on the Gnome Desktop website for Sodipodi users to create a collection of flags in SVG format. The flag project progressed very well, resulting in a collection of over 90 flags made publicly available in SVG format, and broadened the project's goals to include generic clipart. The project became known as Openclipart by April 2004, with the stated aim of making all its contributed images freely available in the public domain.

In the early stages of the Openclipart project, the website lacked thumbnails and was difficult to browse. Downloadable Openclipart packages were released to help propagate the images in the library, and were available directly from the Openclipart website: as an add-on for various Linux distributions such as Fedora, and as an NSIS installer for Windows. Each package included most of the clipart to date, and they were manually sorted into categories. The Openclipart package version 0.20 was released in 2010. The Openclipart packages received a few more incremental updates during 2010, mostly for seasonal clipart.

An overhauled Openclipart 2.0 website went live as a beta in February 2010 with a full release in March 2010. The site introduced a change from the old ccHost software to the new AGPL-based Aiki Framework, a content management system made for Openclipart 2.0. The new site allowed anyone to easily browse and add to the Openclipart collection. Jon Phillips, Andy Fitzsimon, Bassel Safadi, Michi, Ronaldo Barbachano, and Brad Phillips added image thumbnails and improved search functions made the Openclipart library more user-friendly, which contributed to higher site traffic. The site was receiving over 5,000 unique visitors and 50,000 page views daily.

The 3.0 website release incorporated allowed members to "favorite" clip art, and provided an image-editing feature that made image remixing significantly easier.

On April 15, 2013, Openclipart launched a new logo and updated their website design with a "scissors" logo.

On March 12, 2014, Openclipart announced that Inkpad, an open-source drawing app for iPads, had released library integration to make the entire collection available to its users.

Lockdown and attempts at mirroring the library
On April 19, 2019, the site was taken offline by what was initially reported as a distributed denial-of-service attack (DDoS attack), though Jon Philips, one of the site's founders, appeared to be a victim of identity theft. All pages on OpenClipart were redirected to a page asking users to donate money "to support protection". The message was updated on December 25, 2019, with a statement that the site was being "gifted to the community" and that new files could once again be uploaded to the library.

By scraping, most of the library was recovered and hosted on FreeSVG.org. A second mirror was established at FreeSVGClipArt.com.

In early May 2020, the website's Twitter account announced that the search feature had been re-enabled.

Packages and apps
 Inkpad for iPad, with Openclipart Integration.
 The vector graphics editor Inkscape can import vector graphics online from Openclipart to one's current workspace. (For Inkscape on Windows, one needs the latest build, ≥ 0.49.)
 Microsoft Office app
 Google Docs Add-on
 LibreOffice extension
 iOS Clipart, iOS PosterMaker
 Clipart Search, Openclipart for Android
 Clipart plugin for WordPress
 Clipart plugin for Moodle
 Linux distributions
Some Linux distributions, including Mandriva and Ubuntu, include many of the Openclipart collection releases packaged as SVG, PNG or OpenDocument-format files. These distributions are based on the 2005 pre-ccHost release, since regular releases stopped after the switch to ccHost software. Openclipart 0.19, the first version released after the switch, was released in March 2009. With the release of version 2.0 and updated packages, distributions have bugs filed in their respective bug trackers to begin packaging Openclipart once more.

Openclipart was included on the cover discs in Linux Format issues 123 and 132 as a package of browseable SVG files from the Openclipart collection.

See also
 Libre Graphics Meeting
 Font Library
 Pixabay

References

External links

Free image galleries
Open content projects
Scalable Vector Graphics
Internet properties established in 2004
Creative Commons-licensed websites
Public domain
2004 establishments in the United States